The Booth House is a single-story modernist house in Bedford, New York. Built in 1946, the house was American architect Philip Johnson's first residential commission, and is a stylistic precursor to Johnson's better-known 1949 Glass House in New Canaan, Connecticut. 

The house's concrete block and plate glass exterior is supported by steel beams and columns, and its interior features a large masonry fireplace. Its design was influenced by Johnson's  mentors. Landis Gores described the house as a "cross-breed in concrete block between [Johnson's] Lincoln project for [Professor] Bogner and [Le Corbusier's] De Mandrot house from which it had taken its origin: a raised podium."

Johnson designed the house for Richard and Olga Booth, a young couple who wanted a weekend house near Manhattan. Architectural photographer Robert Damora and architect Sirkka Damora purchased the house in 1955 for $23,500 and lived there for 55 years. In 2010, the widowed Sirkka Damora put the  house, an  studio building, and their  lot up for sale, with an asking price of $2 million.

References

Houses completed in 1946
Houses in Westchester County, New York
Modernist architecture in New York (state)
Philip Johnson buildings
1946 establishments in New York (state)